Kitlang Kabua (born 26 June 1991) is a Marshallese politician. She was elected to the Legislature of the Marshall Islands (Nitijeļā) for Kwajalein in the 2019 Marshallese general election, receiving 931 votes. She was 28 at the time of her election, making her the youngest person ever elected to the Nitijeļā. Kabua and former President Hilda Heine were the only two women who obtained a seat. She subsequently was appointed Minister of Education, Sports and Training in the cabinet of her uncle President David Kabua. Kabua took her oath of office on 13 January 2020. The formal inauguration of the cabinet took place on 20 January.

In June 2020 she was included as part of the negotiating team for the renewal of the Compact of Free Association. As Minister she stated in August 2020 she wanted to improve the Marshall Islands Standard Achievement Test scores and worked on sending assistance teams to the outer islands. She also worked on the introduction of a hot lunch program at schools.

She is also a family member of the first President Amata Kabua and the current president David Kabua (The Kabua's family).

References

1991 births
Living people
Government ministers of the Marshall Islands
Members of the Legislature of the Marshall Islands
Women government ministers of the Marshall Islands
21st-century Marshallese women politicians
21st-century Marshallese politicians